Loon is a group of aquatic birds also called diver.

Loon may also refer to:

Places

Europe
 County of Loon, a former county in present Belgium, named after:
 Borgloon, a city and municipality in Belgium
 Loon, Drenthe, a village in the northeastern Netherlands
 Loon op Zand, Netherlands

Other places
 Loon, Iran (disambiguation), several places in Iran
 Loon, Bohol, a municipality in the Philippines
 Loon Mountain, a mountain in Lincoln, New Hampshire, United States
 Loon Mountain Ski Resort, a ski resort at Loon Mountain

Sports teams
 Great Lakes Loons, a minor league baseball team in Midland, Michigan, US
 Forfar Athletic F.C., nicknamed The Loons, a Scottish football team
 Minnesota United FC, nicknamed The Loons, an American soccer team

Other
 Republic-Ford JB-2 or KGW-1 Loon, reverse engineered copy of German V-1 cruise missile, or "buzz bomb" for the US Navy.
 Lunatic, slang loon, or loony, people who are considered mentally ill
 Loon pants, a type of trouser with flared legs
 Loon (rapper) (born 1975), American rapper
 Loon (company), a company by Alphabet testing the use of high-altitude balloons to provide Internet access to rural areas
 Loon (monkey), a monkey who was taught to participate in the treatment of his diabetes.
 Loons: The Fight for Fame, a video game featuring classic Looney Tunes characters
 The Loon, a 2005 album by the band Tapes N Tapes
 Lulubelle Loon, a Disney character
 Loon (album)
 Loon (alias), alias of Yap Weng Wah, a Malaysian serial sex offender

See also
 Loonie, common name for the Canadian 1 dollar coin
 Loon-Plage, a town in France
 Loon op Zand, a municipality and village in the southern Netherlands